Sir Walter de Burghdon, also known as Walter de Burdon, acted as the Constable of Carstairs Castle, the Sheriff of Lanark during 1301-1303 and joint Justiciar of Galloway in 1305.

Biography
Walter was appointed keeper of Carstairs Castle in 1301 what is now South Lanarkshire, Scotland, which he held as his administrative centre as Sheriff of Lanark during the English administration of Scotland. He was replaced by Robert, Earl of Carrick in 1303. He was later appointed as joint Justiciar of Galloway with Roger de Kirkpatrick in 1305. He is recorded as having died in 1309.

Citations

References

People of Medieval Scotland - Walter of Burdon/Burghdon, sheriff of Lanark

English people of the Wars of Scottish Independence
14th-century English people
Year of birth unknown
1309 deaths